Trung Dung (born 1967) is a Vietnamese-American businessman and programmer. His life story has been profiled in many leading publications including Forbes, Financial Times, The Wall Street Journal, and San Francisco Chronicle, as well as in Dan Rather's book The American Dream.

Early life
Dung was born in South Vietnam. During the Fall of Saigon, his father, a lieutenant Colonel in the Army of the Republic of Vietnam was captured by the invading North Vietnamese Army and their Viet Cong allies, and sent to a re-education camp. Dung and one sister were boat people, After his father was released from Communist Concentration Camp, the rest of family immigrated to the United States by ODP program.

Career
Dung completed some postgraduate work in Computer Science at Boston University, received his MBA from BKU and holds bachelor's degrees in Mathematics and Computer Science from the 
University of Massachusetts Boston, where he was the top graduate from the Math and Computer Science Department. He had enrolled there despite poor English and financial resources because of his mathematics ability.

Dung worked as an engineer at Open Market, a developer of Internet commerce software, before deciding to start his own business.

He established OnDisplay Corporation, a software development company, with the aim of designing software to select and retrieve information from related webpages and arrange it in a layout most convenient for the user. As his business experience was limited, no investor could be found. When it appeared that his idea would never be implemented, it was accepted by Mark Pine, the executive director of a division of Sybase Software Company. Two weeks later, OnDisplay had more than 80 clients, including Travelocity. It was one of the 10 most successful IPOs in 1999 and was sold to Vignette Corporation in 2000 for USD1.8 billion.

Dung then founded Fogbreak Solutions, which engaged in business applications aimed at optimizing the flexibility and efficiency of assembly lines. Dung was the chief executive officer of the company, which creates enterprise business applications to optimize supply chain flexibility and liability. Fogbreak is funded by a group of blue-chip investors including Matrix Partners, Greylock, and Sigma Partners. After a few unstable years, investors decided to withdraw support. In May 2004, Bipin Nepani, Nilesh Jain and Trung, founded Bluekey Services.

Dung is now a member of the board of directors of the Vietnam Education Foundation. In May 2004, Trung Dung was awarded a Golden Torch Award at the Vietnamese American National Gala in Washington D.C. In 2006, he returned to Vietnam for the first time and said "I had never thought I would have returned".

His success story was told in publications such as Forbes, the Financial Times, and the Wall Street Journal. He was one of 17 successful American immigrants profiled in The American Dream, a book written by Dan Rather.

References

External links
Stanford Social Innovation Review
iCare Benefits
Fogbreak Software Home Page
Former OnDisplay Founder To Speak At Technology in the Vineyards
Three Top TriValley Entrepreneurs, Technology Company CEOs Join TTEC Advisory Board
Forbes.com: Forbes 400 Richest in America
Golden Torch Award, by the Vietnamese American National Gala
Vietnamese refugee a success on the Internet – He started with determination, $2, AP, 2000
Biography 

1967 births
Living people
American philanthropists
American computer businesspeople
American computer programmers
American technology writers
Boston University alumni
Vietnamese emigrants to the United States
Vietnamese community activists
Vietnamese businesspeople
University of Massachusetts Boston alumni
Academics of Vietnamese descent
Businesspeople of Vietnamese descent